The 1978 U.S. Women's Open was the 33rd U.S. Women's Open, held July 20–23 at  Country Club of Indianapolis in Indianapolis, Indiana.

Defending champion Hollis Stacy won the second of her three U.S. Women's Open titles, one stroke ahead of runners-up JoAnne Carner and  She sank a  putt for par on the 72nd green to secure the win, the second of her four major titles.

Past champions in the field

Made the cut

Source:

Missed the cut

Source:

Final leaderboard
Sunday, July 23, 1978

Source:

References

External links
Golf Observer final leaderboard
U.S. Women's Open Golf Championship
Country Club of Indianapolis

U.S. Women's Open
Golf in Indiana
Sports competitions in Indiana
Sports in Indianapolis
Women's sports in Indiana
U.S. Women's Open
U.S. Women's Open